Marvin Wilson (born September 5, 1998) is an American football defensive tackle for the Philadelphia Eagles of the National Football League (NFL). He played college football at Florida State and signed with the Cleveland Browns as an undrafted free agent in 2021.

Professional career

Cleveland Browns
Wilson signed with the Cleveland Browns following the 2021 NFL Draft on May 3, 2021. Wilson was waived by the Browns on August 31, 2021.

Philadelphia Eagles
On September 2, 2021, Wilson was signed to the Philadelphia Eagles practice squad. Wilson made his NFL debut on January 8, 2022, in the Eagles' week 18 game against the Dallas Cowboys, collecting 3 combined tackles in the 51-26 loss. He signed a reserve/future contract with the Eagles on January 18, 2022.

On August 30, 2022, Wilson was waived by the Eagles and signed to the practice squad the next day.

References

External links 
 Florida State Seminoles bio

1998 births
Living people
Players of American football from Houston
American football defensive tackles
Florida State Seminoles football players
Cleveland Browns players
Philadelphia Eagles players